Sulzheim refers to the following places in Germany:

 Sulzheim, Bavaria
 Sulzheim, Rhineland-Palatinate